The Weyland ringtail possum (Pseudochirulus caroli) is a species of marsupial in the family Pseudocheiridae. It is endemic to the western Central Cordillera of Papua Province, Indonesia.  P. caroli is also "known from four localities west of the Star Mountains" and tends to live in montane forest or other hilly areas.  Currently the Weyland ringtail is not endangered, but should be "monitored [because] it could rapidly become threatened if either human encroachment or hunting were to increase significantly."

References

Possums
Mammals of Western New Guinea
Mammals described in 1921
Taxa named by Oldfield Thomas
Taxonomy articles created by Polbot
Marsupials of New Guinea